is a train station located in Uji, Kyoto Prefecture, Japan, operated by West Japan Railway Company (JR West) and Keihan Electric Railway. It has the Keihan station number "KH75", and the JR West station number "JR-D08".

Lines
Ōbaku Station is served by the JR West Nara Line and by the Keihan Uji Line.

Layout
The Keihan station and the JR station are separate structures not connected directly.

Keihan Railway
The Keihan station has two side platforms serving one track each.

Platforms

JR West
The JR West station has two side platforms serving one track each.

Platforms

History
Station numbering was introduced in March 2018 with Ōbaku being assigned station number JR-D08.

Passenger statistics
According to Kyoto Prefecture statistics, the average number of passengers per day is as follows.

Adjacent stations

Surrounding area
 Kyoto University Uji Campus

References

External links

  
 Keihan station information 

Railway stations in Kyoto Prefecture
Stations of West Japan Railway Company